John MacLeod Fraser (February 12, 1935 – December 29, 2010) was ambassador of Canada to the People's Republic of China from January 11, 1971 to June 10, 1971.

References

1935 births
2010 deaths
Ambassadors of Canada to China